Garamond is a group of many serif typefaces. 

Garamond may also refer to:

 Garamond (font size), or Garmond, a traditional point-size name

People
 Claude Garamond or Garamont (c. 1510–61) French type designer, for whom the typefaces are named
 Jacques Nathan Garamond (1910–2001), French graphic artist

Fictional characters
 Saul Garamond, in King Rat (Miéville novel)
 King Garamond II, in Valhalla and the Fortress of Eve
 Garamond Ray, in The Strange Adventures of Rangergirl
 Futura Garamond, in So Yesterday (novel)

See also

 Garmond (disambiguation)